Gottfried Eichelbrönner (12 November 1901 – 29 October 1986) was a German farmer and politician from the Christian Social Union of Bavaria. He was a member of the Landtag of Bavaria from 1946 to 1962.

References

1901 births
1986 deaths
Members of the Landtag of Bavaria
Christian Social Union in Bavaria politicians